Trifurcula andalusica is a moth of the family Nepticulidae. It is found in the western parts of Andalusia.

The wingspan is 4.6–5 mm.

External links
Seven New Species Of The Subgenus Glaucolepis Braun From Southern Europe (Lepidoptera: Nepticulidae, Trifurcula)

Nepticulidae
Moths of Europe
Moths described in 2007